Květa Peschke and Francesca Schiavone were the defending champions. They were both present but did not compete together.
Peschke partnered with Janette Husárová, but lost in the quarterfinals to Daniela Hantuchová and Ai Sugiyama.
Schiavone partnered with Katarina Srebotnik, but lost in the semifinals to Svetlana Kuznetsova and Alicia Molik.

Cara Black and Liezel Huber won in the final 7–6(6), 6–4, against Svetlana Kuznetsova and Alicia Molik.

Seeds

 Cara Black   Liezel Huber (champions)
 Francesca Schiavone   Katarina Srebotnik (semifinals)
 Daniela Hantuchová   Ai Sugiyama (semifinals) 
 Anna-Lena Grönefeld   Meghann Shaughnessy (first round)

Draw

Draw

External links
Draw

2007 Dubai Tennis Championships
Dubai Tennis Championships